The West Indian Day Parade Carnival is an annual celebration of West Indian culture, held annually on around the first Monday of September in Crown Heights, Brooklyn, New York City. It is organized by the West Indian American Day Carnival Association (WIADCA).

The main event is the West Indian Day Parade (also known as simply the Labor Day Parade), which attracts between one and three million participants. The spectators and participators watch and follow the parade on its route along Eastern Parkway. Some of the Caribbean islands represented in the parade include Trinidad and Tobago, Haiti, Barbados, Dominica, Saint Lucia, Jamaica, Saint Vincent and Grenada, along with some Afro-Panamanians. mainland Caribbean countries such as Guyana, Suriname, and Belize also participate as well.

History

Start in Harlem

Jessie Waddell and some of her West Indian friends started the Carnival in Harlem in the 1930s by staging costume parties in large, enclosed places like the Savoy, Renaissance and Audubon Ballrooms due to the cold wintry weather of February. This is the usual time for the pre-Lenten celebrations of the Trinidad and Tobago Carnival and other related celebrations around the world. However, because of the very nature of Carnival, and the need to parade in costume to music, indoor confinement did not work well.

The earliest known Carnival street parade was held on September 1, 1947. The Trinidad Carnival Pageant Committee was the founding force behind the parade, which was held in Harlem. The parade route was along Seventh Avenue, starting at 110th St.

The first Carnival Queen was Dorothy Godfrey. The Committee raised money to finance the parade. They sold advertisement space and boosters, that were printed in a Souvenir Journal for West Indies Day, a booklet which is a memento of that first parade. Jessie Waddell Compton is presented in the journal as the person "whose inspiration and enterprise" was owed to the formation of this committee. The committee consisted of Waddell Compton-Chairman; Ivan H. Daniel-Vice Chairman; Conrad Matthews-Treasurer; Roy Huggins-Secretary; and Robert J. Welsh-Assistant Secretary. Each member of the committee contributed in helping to organize the parade. The after-parade party, which the Trinidad Carnival Pageant Committee held at the Golden Gate Ballroom, was arranged by James M. Green, another figure who helped make the first Carnival Parade in Harlem successful.

Move to Crown Heights 
The permit for the Harlem parade was revoked in 1964. Five years later, a committee headed by Carlos Lezama, which eventually became the West Indian-American Day Carnival Association, obtained approval for the parade to be established on Eastern Parkway in Brooklyn, where it remains today.

In 2020, the parade was cancelled due to COVID-19 by order of Mayor of New York Bill de Blasio, who canceled all permits for large-scale events through September 2020. The parade was replaced by a virtual event. While the parade did plan to return for 2021, on August 18, 2021 the WIADCA announced that the parade itself would once again be cancelled due to COVID-19 uncertainties, but that it would still hold a mix of in-person and streaming events, including several being held at the Brooklyn Museum.

In popular culture
Many calypso and soca songs from Trinidad make reference to the Labor Day Carnival, including "Gun Play in de Parkway" by Calypso Rose, "Melee (on the Eastern Parkway)" by Maestro, Labor Day Jam by the Guyanese superstar, Slingshot, and "Labor Day in Brooklyn" by the Mighty Sparrow. Jay-Z mentions the Labor Day Carnival on his hit song "Empire State of Mind" (2009), when he says "3 dice Cee-lo, 3 card monte, Labor Day Parade, rest in peace Bob Marley". There are also popular Haitian bands with their powerful meringue-compas music on the parkway, such as T-Vice, Tabou Combo, Konpa Kreyol/Kreyol La, Sweet Micky, Phantoms, Carimi, Djakout, D.P. Express and many more popular bands.

Incidents 

A string of fatal and non-fatal shootings and stabbings has occurred on and near the parade route in recent years, both during and following the parade.

In 2003, a man was fatally shot and another was stabbed in the neck.  In 2005, one man was shot and killed along the parade route.  In 2006, one man was shot and another was stabbed.  At the 2007 parade, there was only one official report of violence, when a man was shot twice in the leg. However, a different man (named Nathaniel Smith) was shot and killed in the 2007 parade. In 2011 pre-dawn marches took a violent turn with the murder of one person, five instances of gunshot victims and three instances of stabbings coupled with sporadic shooting at crowds of people.

Following the 2011 parade, Yolanda Lezama-Clark, The President of the West Indian American Day Carnival Association (WIADCA) and other New York City officials condemned the one or two incidents that took place at the parade.

Additionally during the 2011 West Indian Day Parade in Brooklyn, New York City councilman Jumaane Williams along with a few others were arrested for walking along a closed-off sidewalk, after stating he had received permission to do so from other officers.

Several violent incidents took place after the official end of the 2012 parade. In separate incidents, two people were fatally stabbed, and two others were shot. In 2013, two men were murdered and a further three individuals were wounded in several shootings.

On September 7, 2015, a pre-parade J'ouvert celebration was marred by violence when, at 3:41 a.m., gunfire hit lawyer Carey Gabay in the head. Gabay was an aide to New York Governor Andrew Cuomo and first deputy counsel at Empire State Development Corporation. Gabay died nine days later. The shooting was one of several violent episodes, including a fatal stabbing, in the hours before the parade.

On September 5, 2016, during pre-parade celebrations, two people were shot and killed and five others wounded in attacks. The attacks occurred despite the NYPD doubling the number of officers patrolling the neighborhood, installing 42 new security cameras and erecting 200 light towers. Police also distributed fliers, in conjunction with community groups, with a blunt message: "This community will no longer tolerate this violence. Do not shoot anyone. Do not stab anyone."

See also
 Caribbean Carnival
 J'ouvert
 Scotiabank Caribbean Carnival Toronto

References

External links

 "West Indian-American Day Carnival Association" (WIADCA) official website
 "Maps & Neighborhoods - Brooklyn"  from the official "NYC & Company" website
 "Brooklyn NY Festivals, Fairs & Events: September" from the official "Brooklyn Tourism and Visitors Center"  website

Caribbean-American culture in New York City
Carnival in the United States
Parades in New York City
Summer events in the United States
Festivals of Caribbean culture abroad